

Incumbents
Monarch: Philip V
Secretary of the Universal Bureau: Pedro Fernández del Campo y Angulo

Events
July 27 - Battle of Almenar
August 20 - Battle of Saragossa
September 9 - Philip V abandons Madrid.
September 28 - Archduke Charles enters Madrid.
November 9 - Archduke Charles evacuates Madrid.
December 8–9 - Battle of Brihuega
December 10 - Battle of Villaviciosa

Births
August 13 - Andrés Fernández Pacheco, 10th Duke of Escalona, grandee and academician (died 1746)

Deaths
April 24 - Manuel de Oms, 1st Marquis of Castelldosrius, diplomat, man of letters, Viceroy of Peru, 58
July 8 - Juan García de Salazar, composer, 71
September 9 - Pedro Manuel Colón de Portugal, 7th Duke of Veragua, 58

See also
War of the Spanish Succession

References